Ivanhoe Mordecai Barrow (6 January 1911 – 2 April 1979) was a Jamaican cricketer who played 11 Tests for the West Indies.

Barrow was born to Hyam and Mamie Barrow, two Sephardic Jews on 6 January 1911, a twin to Frank Norton Barrow.  He attended Wolmer's Schools.

A wicket-keeper and opening batsman, he was the first West Indian to score a century in a Test match in England, which he did at Old Trafford in 1933. He also toured Australia and New Zealand during the 1930–31 season, and England again in 1939. In Adelaide in 1930, he became the first batsman to be dismissed by Don Bradman in Test cricket. Bradman took only one other Test wicket, that of Wally Hammond in 1933.

Barrow was one of the most notable Jews in Jamaica, and as of 2010 was the only Jewish cricketer to have scored a century in a Test. He died in Kingston in 1979.

References

External links
 Ivan Barrow at Cricinfo
 Ivan Barrow at Cricket Archive
 Photograph of Ivan Barrow and Oscar Da Costa

1911 births
1979 deaths
Jamaican cricketers
West Indies Test cricketers
Jamaica cricketers
Jamaican Jews
Jewish cricketers
People from Saint Thomas Parish, Jamaica
Wicket-keepers